Royal Air Force Stoke Orchard or more simply RAF Stoke Orchard is a former Royal Air Force station near the village of Stoke Orchard, north west of Cheltenham, Gloucestershire during the Second World War.

History

The airfield was developed in 1940–41, originally as a Relief Landing Ground. In September 1941 it became a training airfield for No. 10 Elementary Flying Training School RAF with 50 de Havilland Tiger Moths were based there. From July 1942 to January 1945 the airfield specialised in the training of glider pilots and instructors with No. 3 Glider Training School RAF (3 GTS) which also used RAF Northleach for training.

The following units were also here at some point:
 No. 5 Maintenance Unit RAF
 WAAF Officers' School
 USAAF 47th Liaison Squadron from April 9-25, 1944, attached to the American First Army Group (FUSAG) with Stinson L-5 liaison aircraft. 

It was also home to a Ministry for Aircraft Production shadow factory run by the Gloster Aircraft Company at Brockworth. There were two large buildings, one for production and one flight shed. This site became the Coal Research Establishment of the National Coal Board following the war.

Current use

Today the airfield has been returned to agriculture/waste plant.

The former Coal Board site has now been developed as a housing estate by Bloor Homes, with the streets named after significant names relating to the former RAF base and Gloster Aircraft Company such as Armstrong Road, Whittle Close, Feddon Close, Hurricane Drive and Zura Drive.

See also
List of former Royal Air Force stations

References

External links
Picture of remaining building

Royal Air Force stations in Gloucestershire